Dual specificity mitogen-activated protein kinase kinase 3 is an enzyme that in humans is encoded by the MAP2K3 gene.

The protein encoded by this gene is a dual specificity protein kinase that belongs to the MAP kinase kinase family. This kinase is activated by mitogenic and environmental stress, and participates in the MAP kinase-mediated signaling cascade. It phosphorylates and thus activates MAPK14/p38-MAPK. This kinase can be activated by insulin, and is necessary for the expression of glucose transporter. Expression of RAS oncogene is found to result in the accumulation of the active form of this kinase, which thus leads to the constitutive activation of MAPK14, and confers oncogenic transformation of primary cells. The inhibition of this kinase is involved in the pathogenesis of Yersinia pseudotuberculosis. Multiple alternatively spliced transcript variants that encode distinct isoforms have been reported for this gene.

Interactions
MAP2K3 has been shown to interact with TAOK2 and PLCB2.

References

Further reading

EC 2.7.12